Erik Otto Larsen (1931 – January 2008) was a Danish novelist, who was active as a visual artist before starting as a writer. He received the Glass Key award in 1995 for the crime novel Masken i spejlet (1994).

Selected bibliography
Pondus sidste sag (1988)
Så længe jeg lever (1989)
Manden der holdt op med at smile (1990)
Frihedens skygge (1990) 
Masken i spejlet (1994)
En kat fortræd (1996)

References

1931 births
2008 deaths
Danish male novelists
Danish artists
20th-century Danish novelists
20th-century Danish male writers